W. T. Henry was an American football coach, and the fourth head coach of Harding College, in 1927. The season was a disastrous 0-8-1.

The season began with only three of the previous year's players showing up for practice. One of those was fourth-year player Clyde "Doc" Matthews, who was the "player/coach" from the year before. The other two veterans to show up were "Tate" Mills and "Swede" Patton. The Harding yearbook The Petit Jean wrote:

The team gave up 259 points on the year and only scored 6 points. The editors of The Petit Jean hinted at attitude problems on the team: 

The Petit Jean editors found some kinder words for Coach Henry's veterans and hope for the future:

References

Harding Bisons football coaches